Joannes Gerardus "Joop" Wijn (born 20 May 1969) is a retired Dutch politician of the Christian Democratic Appeal (CDA) party and businessman.

Wijn attended a Gymnasium in Haarlem from April 1981 until May 1987 and applied at the University of Amsterdam in June 1987 majoring in Economics and obtaining a Bachelor of Economics degree in June 1989 before graduating with a Master of Economics degree in July 1991 and applied subsequently for a postgraduate education in Law and obtaining a Bachelor of Laws degree in June 1992 before graduating with a Master of Economics degree in July 1994. Wijn worked as a economics teacher at the Kennemer Lyceum in Overveen and Schoevers from August 1991 until July 1994. Wijn worked as a financial analyst at the ABN AMRO from July 1994 until May 1998.

Wijn was elected as a Member of the House of Representatives after the election of 1998, taking office on 19 May 1998 serving as a frontbencher and spokesperson for Finances, Small business, Integration and deputy spokesperson for Economic Affairs and Postal Services. After the election of 2002 Wijn was appointed as State Secretary for Economic Affairs in the Cabinet Balkenende I, taking office on 22 July 2002. The Cabinet Balkenende I fell just four months later on 16 October 2002 after tensions in the coalition over the stability of the Pim Fortuyn List (LPF) and continued to serve in a demissionary capacity. After the election of 2003 Wijn returned as a Member of the House of Representatives, taking office on 30 January 2003. Following the cabinet formation of 2003 Wijn was appointed as State Secretary for Finance in the Cabinet Balkenende II, taking office on 27 May 2003. The Cabinet Balkenende II fell on 30 June 2006 after the Democrats 66 (D66) had lost confidence in the functioning of Minister of Integration and Asylum Affairs Rita Verdonk and continued to serve in a demissionary capacity until the cabinet formation of 2006 when it was replaced by the caretaker Cabinet Balkenende III with Wijn appointed as Minister of Economic Affairs, taking office on 7 July 2006. After the election of 2006 Wijn again returned as a Member of the House of Representatives, taking office on 30 November 2006. On 6 February 2007 Wijn unexpectedly announced his retirement from national politics and per his own request asked not to be considered for a cabinet post in the new cabinet, the Cabinet Balkenende III was replaced by the Cabinet Balkende IV on 22 February 2007 and he resigned as a Member of the House of Representatives the same day.

Wijn retired from national politics and became active in the private sector, in June 2007 he was named as chief business officer (CBO) of the Rabobank. In February 2009 Wijn was named as chief marketing officer (CMO) of the ABN AMRO. In May 2017 Wijn was named as chief strategy officer (CSO) and chief risk officer (CRO) of Adyen. Wijn also became active in the public sector and occupied numerous seats as a nonprofit director on several boards of directors and supervisory boards (Orange Foundation, :nl:Stadsherstel Amsterdam and the Jaarbeurs). Wijn also works as a trade association executive for the Industry and Employers confederation (VNO-NCW).

Politics 
In 1998, he became a Member of the House of Representatives for the Christian Democratic Appeal. As an MP he focused on public finances, small businesses and immigration politics. In 2000 he was also one of the few CDA MPs that voted in favour of a law making same-sex marriages legal in the Netherlands. The debate about same-sex marriage caused friction between his personal life and his political affiliation, as Wijn himself is gay.

In July 2002, Wijn became a State Secretary for Economic Affairs in the first Balkenende cabinet, responsible for foreign trade. In the second Balkenende cabinet he was State Secretary for Finance, and among other things responsible for the functioning of the Internal Revenue Service. He transformed the IRS into an organisation that not only collects but also redistributes funds, e.g. for healthcare expenses, rent support and child benefits. His platform was the reduction of red tape and the promotion of tax benefits for families with children.

Wijn is credited with leading the creation of the famous Dutch Sandwich BEPS tax scheme, one of the world's largest tax sheltering BEPS tools, (amongst other Dutch multinational BEPS tools, including Dutch "double dip" hybrid Debt-based BEPS tool, as used by Dutch based global mining/resource companies to avoid taxes in developing nations), after lobbying from U.S. tax lawyers from 2003-2006. They are credited with making the Netherlands one of the world’s largest corporate tax havens (see the ten major tax havens).

Business  
Wijn left politics after a new cabinet was installed. He was asked earlier by the CDA party leadership to take on the parliamentary leadership of his party, but Wijn declined that position in August. In June 2007 Joop Wijn became a director of Rabobank Nederland, in 2009 Gerrit Zalm asked him to join ABN-AMRO, which he did.

Decorations

References

External links

Official
  Mr.Drs. J.G. (Joop) Wijn Parlement & Politiek

 

 

1969 births
Living people
Christian Democratic Appeal politicians
Dutch bankers
Dutch corporate directors
Dutch financial advisors
Dutch financial analysts
Dutch fiscal jurists
Dutch expatriates in Indonesia
Dutch members of the Dutch Reformed Church
Dutch nonprofit directors
Dutch nonprofit executives
Gay politicians
Dutch LGBT businesspeople
LGBT cabinet members of the Netherlands
LGBT Calvinist and Reformed Christians
LGBT conservatism
LGBT members of the Parliament of the Netherlands
Members of the House of Representatives (Netherlands)
Ministers of Economic Affairs of the Netherlands
Officers of the Order of Orange-Nassau
Businesspeople from Amsterdam
Politicians from Haarlem
Protestant Church Christians from the Netherlands
Shell plc people
State Secretaries for Economic Affairs of the Netherlands
State Secretaries for Finance of the Netherlands
University of Amsterdam alumni
20th-century Dutch businesspeople
20th-century Dutch economists
20th-century Dutch politicians
21st-century Dutch businesspeople
21st-century Dutch economists
Politicians from Amsterdam
21st-century Dutch politicians
Businesspeople from Haarlem